William Charles Paradee III (born July 18, 1969) is an American politician and a Democratic member of the Delaware Senate representing district 17. He was a member of the Delaware House of Representatives from 2012 to 2018. Paradee earned a BA in English and an MBA from the University of Delaware.

Electoral history
In 2008, Paradee challenged incumbent Republican Pamela Thornburg, but lost the general election by 50 votes. Thornburg retired from the legislature at the end of this term.
In 2012, Paradee challenged incumbent Republican Lincoln Willis, and won the general election with 5,183 votes (54.3%).
In 2014, Paradee won the general election with 3,332 votes (57.4%) against Republican nominee Peter Kramer.
In 2016, Paradee won the general election with 6,777 votes (62%) against Republican nominee Janice Gallagher and Green nominee Ruth James.
In 2018, Paradee ran for an open seat in the Delaware Senate, and won the general election with 9,343 votes (64.3%) against Republican nominee Justin King.

References

External links
Official page at the Delaware General Assembly
 

1969 births
Living people
Democratic Party members of the Delaware House of Representatives
People from Dover, Delaware
University of Delaware alumni
21st-century American politicians